Balachandran Chullikkad (born 30 July 1957) is an Indian poet, orator, lyricist and actor in Malayalam-language.

Early life
Balachandran was born in Paravur, Ernakulam, Kerala, India. He completed his graduation in English literature from the Union Christian College, Aluva (first two years) and Maharajas College, Ernakulam.

Career
His collection of poems published includes Pathinettu Kavithakal, Amaavaasi, Ghazal, Maanasaantharam, Dracula etc. Another collection of his previously published poems, Balachandran Chullikkadinte Kavithakal (The Poems of Balachandran Chullikkad), was published in 2000. He has also published a book of his memoirs, Chidambarasmarana (2001).

He has participated in many national literary seminars organised by the Central Academy of Letters, India. He was one among the ten members of a cultural delegation of India to Sweden in 1997 invited by Nobel Academy and Swedish Writers Union. He represented Indian poetry in the international bookfair in Gothenburg, Sweden in November 1997.

Chullikkad is also an actor in Malayalam films and serials. As an actor, he is best known for G. Aravindan's Pokkuveyil (1981) in which he played a young artist who lives with his father, a radical friend and a music-loving young woman. The film is about how his world collapses when his father dies, the radical friend leaves him and her family takes the woman away to another city.

In 2018, he criticised the state education department for their incompetency in teaching Malayalam language. He urged it to remove his poems from curricula in schools, colleges and universities. Chullikkadu alleged that marks were being given in abundance for papers containing mistakes without proper evaluation, and the appointment of Malayalam teachers are not on the basis of qualifications, but caste, religion, political influence and nepotism. He said research work on Malayalam literature lack quality and that doctoral degrees were conferred on even those works which contain mistakes.

Personal life
Chullikkad is married to Vijayalakshmi, a known Malayalam poet and they have a son named Appu.

In 2000, he took Buddhism as his religion. He says that this cannot be called a conversion from Hinduism because he was never a follower of that religion. "I have not converted because I have not been a believer though I was a Hindu. I have now embraced Buddhism, not converted to Buddhism. The problem with Hinduism is that it is a religion of social status and set-ups. Your value in Hinduism depends on the family in which you were born," he says.

Political views
In a 2000 interview, Chullikkadu revealed that he was a sympathizer of the Naxalite movement during his teenage years. He then continued as a Marxist for some years. But after the fall of the Soviet Union and "the Eastern European experience", he rethought his conviction about Marxism and reorganised his intellectual life on a different path. "I found that Marxism is outdated and irrelevant. Now I am not a Marxist, but a social and political democrat. Soviet experience proved that individual freedom without the base of socialism and socialism without sanctioning individual freedom is a failure. Communism practised all over the world is some kind of socialism without sanctioning individual freedom. Communism without approving individual freedom is social fascism", he said.

Awards
In 1990, he refused the Sanskriti Award for the best young writer in India and declared that he would not accept any award for his literary works. In 2001, his work Balachandran Chullikkadinte Kavithakal was selected for the Kerala Sahitya Akademi Award for Poetry, but Chullikkadu did not accept the award. In 2003, he received the National Film Award for Best Non-Feature Film Narration / Voice Over (Non Feature Film Category) for The 18 Elephants – 3 Monologues.

Bibliography

Poetry
 Pathinettu Kavithakal (Trichur: Rasana, 1980)
 Amavasi (Kottayam: S.P.C.S., 1982)
 Ghazal (Kottayam: DC Books, 1987)
 Ente Sachidanandan Kavithakal (Calicut: Bodhi, 1993)
 Manasantharam (Trichur: Current, 1994)
 Dracula (Kottayam: DC Books, 1998)
 Balachandran Chullikkadinte Kavithakal (Kottayam: DC Books, 2000)
 Prathinayakan (Kottayam: DC Books, 2013)
 Balachandran Chullikkadinte Kavitha Paribhashakal (Kottayam: DC Books, 2013)
 Rakthakinnaram (Kottayam: DC Books, 2017)
 Alakal (Calicut: Mathrubhumi, 2021)

Others
 Chidambarasmarana (Alwaye: Pen, 1998, memoirs)
 Hiranyam (Kottayam: DC Books, 2019, short novel)

  Translation of poems by Pablo Neruda, Charles Baudelaire, Rabindranath Tagore, Tennyson etc.
  First published in 1977 in Veekshanam Varshikapathippu

Filmography

Films
Actor

 Pokkuveyil (1982)
 Ezhuthaappurangal (1987)
 Theertham (1987)
 Marikkunnilla Njaan (1988)
 Pradakshinam (1994)
 Sraadham (1994)
 Rappakal (2005)
 Manikyan (2005) as himself
 The Tiger (2005)
 Nerariyan CBI (2005)
 Makalkku (2005) ... Sound Presence
 Bharathchandran IPS (2005)
 Chinthamani Kolacase (2006)
 Aanachantham (2006)
 Vasthavam (2006)
 Ali Bhai (2007)
 Abraham & Lincoln (2007)
 Nasrani (2007)
 One Way Ticket (2008)
 Parunthu (2008) ... Abraham
 Oridathoru Puzhayundu (2008)
 Minnaminnikkoottam (2008)
 Pakal Nakshathrangal (2008)
 Roudram (2008)
 Kali (2009)
 Ividam Swargammanu (2009)
 Vellathooval (2009)
 Sagar Alias Jackey (2009)
 Samastha Keralam P.O. (2009)
 Patham Nilayile Theevandi (2009)
 Utharaswayamvaram (2009)
 Chattambinadu (2009)
 Madhyavenal (2009)
 Vairam: Fight for Justice
 Ivar Vivahitharayal (2009)
 Drona (2010)
 Pokkiri Raja (2010)
 Amma Nilaavu (2010)
 Sadgamaya (2010)
 Bodyguard (2010)
 Elsamma Enna Aankutty (2010)
 Sakudumbam Shyamala (2010)
 Pranchiyettan and the Saint (2010)
 Ithu Nammude Katha (2011)
 Three Kings (2011)
 15 August (2011)
 Collector (2011)
 Bombay March 12 (2011)
 Orkoot Orarmakoot (2012)
 Naughty Professor (2012)
 Ayaalum Njaanum Thammil (2012)
 Mayamohini (2012)
 Thattatin Maryathu (2012)
 Last Bench (2012)
 Nine One Six – 916 (2012)
 Sound Thoma (2013)
 Bharya Athra Pora (2013)
 August Club (2013)
 White Paper (2013)
 Lokpaal (2013)
 Emmanuel (2013)
 Proprietors : Kammath & Kammath (2013)
 Namboothiri Yuvavu @ 43 (2013)
 Kadal Kadannu Oru Mathukkutty (2013)
 Nadodimannan (2013) ... KRP
 Omega.exe (2013)
 Silence (2013)
 Pigman (2013)
 Lasarinte Lokam
 Point Blank
 Ente Priyathamanu
 Kaattum Mazhayum
 Avarude Veedu
 Avicharitha
 Cousins (2014)
 The Dolphins (2014)
 Pranayakatha (2014)
 Kootathil Oral (2014)
 Manja (2014)
 Mr.Fraud (2014)
 On The Way (2014)
 Thomson Villa (2014)
 Parayan Bakki Vechathu (2014)
 Ringmaster (2014)
 Onnum Mindathe (2014)
 Kumbasaram (2015)
 Mashithandu (2015)
 Oru New Generation Pani (2015)
 Onnam Loka Mahayudham (2015)
 Tharakangale Sakshi (2015)
 Ellam Chettante Ishtam Pole (2015) 
 32aam Adhyayam 23aam Vaakyam (2015)
 Two Countries (2015)
 Action Hero Biju (2016)
 Kolamass (2016)
 Pachakallam (2016)
 King Liar (2016)
 Action Hero Biju (2016)
 Welcome to Central Jail (2016)
 Hello Dubaikkaran (2017)
 Sathya (2017)
 Aakashamittayi (2017)
 Kaaliyan (2017)
 Role Models (2017)
 Viswavikyathamay Payyanmar (2017)
 Marubhoomiyile Mazhathullikal (2018)
 Aami (2018)
 Ottakoru Kamukan (2018)
 Neeli (2018)
 Mohanlal (2018)
 Ira (2018)
 Oru Pazhaya Bomb Kadha  (2018)
 Thanaha (2018) 
 Ottakoru Kaamukan (2018)
 Janathipan (2019)
 Madhura Raja (2019)
 Children's Park (2019)
 Thrissur Pooram (2019)
 Ice Orathi (2021)
 Bheeshma Parvam (2021) as Girija Achari 
 Naaradan (2022) 

Music composer
 "Amme Pinvili Vilikkaathe" ... 	Pokkuveyil	1982
 "Oru Ormmathan" ... 	Pokkuveyil	1982
 "Paampu Kadicha" ... 	Ezhuthaappurangal	1987

Lyricist

 Amme Pinvili Vilikkaathe ... 	Pokkuveyil	1982
 Oru Ormmathan ... 	Pokkuveyil	1982	
 Nimishamaam ... 	Sruthi	1987	
 Leelaaravindam ... 	Sruthi	1987	
 Cheekithirukiya ... 	Sruthi	1987	
 Onam Vannu (Bit) ... 	Sruthi	1987	
 Ganapathiye Nin Achan ... 	Theertham	1987	
 Aathintho ... 	Theertham	1987	
 Bas More Nainan ... 	Theertham	1987	
 Paampu Kadicha ... 	Ezhuthaappurangal	1987	
 Kaanaamarayathu ... 	Pradakshinam	1994	
 Kaavalam Kiliye ... 	Saamoohya Paadam	1996	
 Kaavalam Kiliye ... 	Saamoohya Paadam	1996	
 Indrasabha ... 	Abraham & Lincoln	2007	
 Thakkida Tharikida ... 	Abraham & Lincoln	2007	
 Swapnamaraalike ... 	Abraham & Lincoln	2007	
 Kezhamaankannaale ... 	Abraham & Lincoln	2007	
 uduraajamukhi ... Abraham & Lincoln 2007 
 Raagam Shokam ... 	Thaniye	2007	G Venugopal

Playback singer
 Poothappaattu ... 	Chillu	1982	
 Amme Pinvili Vilikkaathe ... 	Pokkuveyil	1982	
 Oru Ormmathan ... 	Pokkuveyil	1982	
 Paampu Kadicha ... 	Ezhuthaappurangal	1987	
 Idavamaasa perumazha ... 	Makalkku	2005

Story
 Jaalakam (1987)
 Idanaazhiyil Oru Kaalocha (1987)
 Oozham (1988)
 Orukkam (1990)

Dialogue
 Jaalakam (1987)
 Idanaazhiyil Oru Kaalocha (1987)

Screenplay
 Jaalakam (1987)

Television

Amma Makal (Zee Keralam)
Thoovalsparsham (Asianet)
Thinkalkalamaan (Surya TV)
Chackoyum Maryyum (Mazhavil Manorama)
Sumangali Bhava (Zee Keralam)
Bhagyajathakam (Mazhavil Manorama)
Gauri (Surya TV)
Seetha (Flowers TV)
Ammuvinte Amma (Mazhavil Manorama)
Pokkuveyil (Flowers TV)
Mayamohini (Mazhavil Manorama)
Karuthamuthu (Asianet)
Ganga (Doordarshan)
Eran Nilav (Doordarshan)
Devimahathmyam (Asianet)
Balamani (Mazhavil Manorama)
Chila Nerangalil Chila Manushyar (Amrita TV)
Vadakaikkoru Hridayam (Amrita TV)
Kathayile Rajakumari (Mazhavil Manorama)
Pookalam (Surya TV) - title song lyrics
Mizhi Thurakkumo (Doordarshan)
Thulabharam (Surya TV)
Indhraneelam (Surya TV)
Priyamanasi (Surya TV)
Swapnagale Kaaval (Kairali TV)
Meera (Asianet)
Makalude Amma (Surya TV)
Mizhi Thurakkumbol (Surya TV)
Venalmazha (Surya TV)
Parvanendu

References

External links

 
 

1957 births
Living people
People from Ernakulam district
Poets from Kerala
Male actors from Kerala
Malayalam-language writers
Malayalam poets
Indian Buddhists
Converts to Buddhism from Hinduism
Male actors in Malayalam cinema
Male actors in Malayalam television
Indian male film actors
Recipients of the Kerala Sahitya Akademi Award
Indian male poets
20th-century Indian poets
20th-century Indian male actors
20th-century Indian composers
Indian male playback singers
Indian male composers
Indian male screenwriters
Malayalam screenwriters
Malayalam playback singers
Indian lyricists
21st-century Indian male actors
20th-century Indian dramatists and playwrights
Film musicians from Kerala
Screenwriters from Kerala
20th-century Indian male writers
20th-century Indian male singers
20th-century Indian singers